Zyryanka (Zıryanka) is an urban locality (an urban-type settlement) and the administrative center of Verkhnekolymsky District in the Sakha Republic, Russia, on the left bank of the Kolyma River. As of the 2010 Census, its population was 3,170.

History
It was founded in 1937 in connection with the development of coal deposits and was granted urban-type settlement status in 1940.

Administrative and municipal status
Within the framework of administrative divisions, the urban-type settlement of Zyryanka serves as the administrative center of Verkhnekolymsky District. As an administrative division, it is incorporated within Verkhnekolymsky District as the Settlement of Zyryanka. As a municipal division, the Settlement of Zyryanka is incorporated within Verkhnekolymsky Municipal District as Zyryanka Urban Settlement.

Economy
Coal mining is central to the economy of the region. Zyryanka is home to OAO Kolyma Shipping Company, which is engaged in coal transportation and importation of industrial goods and foodstuffs.

Transportation
Zyryanka is served by the Zyryanka Airport (main) and the Zyryanka West Airport (secondary).

Climate
Zyryanka has a subarctic climate (Köppen Dfc), with extremely cold winters and mild summers. Precipitation is highest in the summer and lowest in late winter or spring.

References

Notes

Sources
Official website of the Sakha Republic. Registry of the Administrative-Territorial Divisions of the Sakha Republic. Verkhnekolymsky District. 

Urban-type settlements in the Sakha Republic
Road-inaccessible communities of the Sakha Republic
Kolyma basin